Friction is the debut album by psychedelic progressive gothic rock composer Phideaux Xavier. It was released in 1993. It is not, however, considered as an official album by him.

Tracks
"Arise" (01:33)
"Love of a Million Doves" (05:30)
"Secret" (04:16)
"The Odyssey" (04:36)
"Lights Camera Friction" (05:13)
"Ashes" (0:34)
"The Life" (03:55)
"Resurrection Pact" (03:43)
"Inspecting the Spoils" (04:00)
"Aquamarine" (04:05)
"Zarathustra 2000" (02:25)
"Living (On the Petals)" (04:22)
"All Seeing Eye" (03:58)
"Claw the Land" (05:31)
"Azrael" (02:18)
"Bridge" (0:55)
"If We Will" (03:51)
"Menace" (0:42)
"Letters to the Tiger" (02:53)
"Tell Me" (05:04)
"Wake Up Little Beauties" (04:50)
(unlisted) (02:19)

Personnel
Phideaux Xavier / guitar, bass, keyboards, vocals
Patrick Arena / vocals
Rob Costin / vocals
Valerie Gracious / vocals
Grant King / vocals
Dan Martin / vocals
Rick Robertson / vocals
Will Guterman / keyboards, vocals
David Lewis / keyboards
R. Weis / samples
Anne DeWann / flute, vocals
David Doris / soprano sax
Ariel Farber / violin, vocals
Dawn Buckholz / cello
Sam Fenster / bass, vocals
Linda Ruttan / bass, vocals
Molly Ruttan / drums
Michael Newman / drums
Christopher Ballant / spoken word
Michael Zener Gottlieb / spoken word
Ian Scott Horst / spoken word
Cayte Jablow / spoken word
Michael Kowalewsk / spoken word

References

Phideaux Xavier albums
1993 debut albums